Cieran James Dunne (born 8 February 2000) is a professional footballer, who plays as a midfielder for Scottish Championship side Cove Rangers. He has previously played for Falkirk and Sunderland.

Career
Dunne signed a professional contract with Falkirk in 2017, having graduated from the Forth Valley Football Academy.

Dunne moved to Sunderland in August 2019. He made his Sunderland debut in an EFL Trophy tie against Fleetwood Town on 10 November 2020, replacing Oliver Younger just before half-time. His appearance was brief after suffering a dislocated shoulder which saw him replaced in the 51st minute by Vinnie Steels. Dunne was released by Sunderland at the end of the 2021–22 season.

After a trial spell with Doncaster Rovers, Dunne signed for Cove Rangers in August 2022.

Career statistics

Notes

References

2000 births
Living people
Scottish footballers
Association football forwards
Scottish Professional Football League players
Falkirk F.C. players
Sunderland A.F.C. players
Cove Rangers F.C. players